Bill Bergson and the White Rose Rescue is a novel.

Bill Bergson and the White Rose Rescue may also refer to:
Bill Bergson and the White Rose Rescue (1953 film)
Bill Bergson and the White Rose Rescue (1997 film)